IFC Films is an American film production and distribution company based in New York. It is an offshoot of IFC owned by AMC Networks. It distributes mainly independent films under its own name, select foreign films and documentaries under its Sundance Selects label and genre films under its IFC Midnight label. It operates the IFC Center.

History
The IFC Films division has a predecessor film label, Next Wave Films, designed to release movies, which was in operation from 1997 to 2002, when it was shut down and folded into IFC themselves. IFC also launched a film company, IFC Productions, which set up operation in March 1997 to produce their own feature film projects. On January 18, 1999, IFC launched a film label Agenda 2000, which set up their own film projects, which have their world premiere on IFC.

On September 26, 2000, IFC launched its own feature film unit, branded IFC Films, to be headed by Bob Berney, who went on to have jobs at Newmarket Films, and later founder of Picturehouse.

IFC has several ventures in video on demand (VOD), available through cable television pay-per-view, Apple iTunes, and formerly Blockbuster's Movielink.  In 2002, IFC Films struck a deal with MGM Home Entertainment to release its theatrical films to home video, until they along with IFC's original TV shows moved to Genius Products in 2006 as part of a deal signed by Rainbow Media.

In 2006, IFC launched IFC First Take, combining a limited theatrical release with video on demand being available the same day. The films included would be shown at IFC owned IFC Center, as well as other theaters; Landmark Theatres were the first outside theaters announced. That same year, In 2006, IFC Films began distributing some films to Apple iTunes. The first batch were thirteen films with nominations in the Film Independent Spirit Awards.  In a March 2008 panel discussion, IFC Film's Arianna Bocco stated that all its films would be released through First Take. That same year, IFC launched IFC Festival Direct, a platform for video on demand distribution, for films without a slated theatrical release in the United States. in 2010, it was announced that IFC Films would be launching a division titled IFC Midnight, the division would focus on releasing horror, sci-fi, thrillers, erotic arthouse, and action.
 
In 2009, IFC signed home video deals with MPI Media Group and the Criterion Collection.

In February 2015, Shout! Factory's Scream Factory made a deal with IFC Films to release their titles on their IFC Midnight label. This included the Blu-ray and DVD releases of The Babadook and Backcountry, among others.

On May 27, 2015, IFC Films struck another home video distribution deal with Paramount Home Media Distribution.

On July 30, 2018, AMC Networks reached a definitive agreement to acquire RLJ Entertainment where AMC would pay $59 million for the remaining RLJE shares not owned by AMC or Robert L. Johnson. The transaction was approved by RLJ Entertainment's stockholders on October 31, and AMC Networks completed the acquisition on November 1. RLJ Entertainment became a privately owned subsidiary of AMC Networks, with Johnson and his affiliates owning a 17% stake. RLJ Entertainment, as IFC Films' sister company, took over home video distribution of their titles in December 2021.

Film library

See also
Scream Factory
Midnite Movies

References

External links
Official site

Film distributors of the United States
 
AMC Networks
Mass media companies established in 2000
2000 establishments in New York (state)